A list of films produced in Argentina in 1968:

External links and references
 Argentine films of 1968 at the Internet Movie Database

1968
Films
Argentine